Polyisothianaphthene (PITN) is a conducting polymer that exhibits better conductivity than its relative, polythiophene.

References

Conductive polymers